Saint Joseph University in Dubai was founded in 2008. It is a branch campus of the prestigious Saint Joseph University in Beirut, Lebanon.

SJU Dubai is accredited by the Knowledge and Human Development Authority. It is located in Dubai International Academic City. It so far offers two degrees:

 - Bachelor of Law by the School of Law
 - Master of Arts in Translation by the School of Translators.

History of the School of Translators 
Since its foundation in 1980, the School of Translators and Interpreters of Beirut (ETIB) has been training senior translators and interpreters with the highest standards to master Arabic, French and English languages as well as intercultural competencies by helping them to adapt to cultural differences, sharpen strong analytical and deductive skills, and develop professional judgment. Member of CIUTI (International Standing Conference of University Institutes of Translators and Interpreters) and of the FIT (International Federation of Translators), recognized by the AIIC (International Association of Conference Interpreters), and having a long-standing and close relation with the United Nations and the European Parliament, ETIB aspires to be an active member among the university institutions of the world and a pole of excellence in the fields of research and innovation in the Arab world.

The Master in Translation 
Saint Joseph University - Dubai offers a Master in Translation upon the completion of:

- A full-time track of 15 months

- A part-time track of 18–24 months

The curriculum includes the bases of translation from English into Arabic and Arabic into English
It covers thematic concepts and terminologies related to the following specific fields:
Literature, Journalism, Media, and Copywriting, Law, Economy, International Conferences/ Organizations, Banks, IT systems.

See also
 List of Jesuit sites

References 

Jesuit universities and colleges
Universities and colleges in Dubai
Catholic universities and colleges in the United Arab Emirates
Educational institutions established in 2008
Dubai
Translation and interpreting schools
2008 establishments in the United Arab Emirates